Genghis Khan (c. 1162 – 1227) was the founder and Great Khan (Emperor) of the Mongol Empire. 

Genghis Khan may also refer to:

Film and television 
 Genghis Khan (1950 film), a 1950 Filipino film starring Manuel Conde, Ric Bustamante
Changez Khan, a 1957 Indian Hindi-language film, starring Sheikh Mukhtar as the emperor
 Genghis Khan (1965 film), a 1965 British film starring Omar Sharif
 Genghis Khan (TVB TV series), a 1987 Hong Kong television series produced by TVB
 Genghis Khan (ATV TV series), a 1987 Hong Kong television series produced by ATV
 Genghis Khan (1998 film), a 1998 Chinese film
 Genghis Khan (2004 TV series), a 2004 Chinese-Mongolian television series
 Genghis Khan (documentary), a 2005 British television documentary
 Genghis Khan: To the Ends of the Earth and Sea, a 2007 Japanese film
 Genghis Khan (2018 film), 2018 Chinese film

Music 
 Dschinghis Khan, German pop group
 "Dschinghis Khan" (song), 1979 song
 Dschinghis Khan (album), 1979 album
 "Genghis Khan" (Miike Snow song)
 "Genghis Khan" (Jedi Mind Tricks song)
 "Genghis Khan", a song by Ace Frehley from the album Anomaly
 "Genghis Khan", a song by Iron Maiden from the album  Killers
 "Genghis Khan", a song by Running Wild from the album Gates to Purgatory
 "Genghis Khan", a song by Cavalera Conspiracy from the album Blunt Force Trauma
 "Genghis Khan", a song by the album Stanley Huang
 "Genghis Khan", a song by Iron Mask from the album Black as Death
 "The Great Chinggis Khaan," a 2019 song by The HU

Other uses 
 Jingisukan, a Japanese dish of grilled mutton, named after the emperor
 Aoki Ōkami to Shiroki Mejika, video game series, also known as Genghis Khan in Western countries
 Genghis Khan (video game), a 1987 strategy game
 Buyant-Ukhaa International Airport, formerly named Chinggis Khaan International Airport, an airport in Mongolia
 Operation Chengiz Khan, an operation that marked the start of the Indo-Pakistani War of 1971
 Genghis Khan and the Making of the Modern World, a 2004 book by Jack Weatherford
 Genghis Khan: The Emperor of All Men, a book by Harold Lamb

See also 

 Genghis (disambiguation)
 Chinggis (disambiguation)
 Temujin (disambiguation)
 Changezi, surname